Marko Čakarević (born May 13, 1988) is a Serbian professional basketball player for Žitko Basket.

Professional career
Čakarević started his professional career with the French team ASVEL, where he played from 2006 to 2008. In January 2009, Čakarević joined the Macedonian side Pelister, but returned to his homeland in March 2009, when he signed for Swisslion Takovo. From 2009 to 2011, Čakarević played for Radnički Kragujevac. In the summer of 2011, Čakarević was signed by Partizan. On August 2, 2013, he terminated his contract with Partizan and became a free agent. In November 2013, he signed with Metalac Valjevo.

In August 2014, he signed a one-year deal with Igokea. In August 2015, he re-signed with the team. In the preseason tournament played in Valjevo, he injured his shoulder, injury that will likely keep him off the court the entire season.

In the summer of 2016, he signed with Romanian club Timișoara. In December 2016, he parted ways with Timișoara after appearing in six games. In February 2017, he signed with Serbian club Dynamic for the rest of the season. He was named the MVP of the Serbian Super League's 2017 season.

On September 19, 2017, he returned to Partizan for the 2017–18 season. He left Partizan in June 2018.

On October 22, 2018, he returned to Dynamic for the 2018–19 season. 
On November 30, he signed with Lithuanian club Lietkabelis.

On February 21, 2020, he signed with Hungarian club Kaposvár for the 2019–20 season.

National team career 
Čakarević won the gold medals at the 2007 FIBA Under-19 World Championship and the 2008 FIBA Europe Under-20 Championship.

References

External links
 Marko Čakarević at aba-liga.com
 Marko Čakarević at eurobasket.com
 Marko Čakarević at euroleague.net
 Marko Čakarević at lnb.fr

1988 births
Living people
ABA League players
ASVEL Basket players
Basketball League of Serbia players
BC Lietkabelis players
KK Dynamic players
KK Igokea players
KK Metalac Valjevo players
KK Partizan players
KK Radnički Kragujevac (2009–2014) players
KK Star players
KK Lions/Swisslion Vršac players
KK Zdravlje players
KK Žitko Basket players
Kaposvári KK players
Serbian expatriate basketball people in Bosnia and Herzegovina
Serbian expatriate basketball people in France
Serbian expatriate basketball people in Hungary
Serbian expatriate basketball people in Lithuania
Serbian expatriate basketball people in Romania
Serbian expatriate basketball people in North Macedonia
Serbian men's basketball players
Serbian men's 3x3 basketball players
Small forwards
Basketball players from Belgrade